Byttneria minytricha is a species of flowering plant in the family Malvaceae. It is found only in Ecuador. Its natural habitat is subtropical or tropical moist montane forests.

References

minytricha
Endemic flora of Ecuador
Critically endangered plants
Taxonomy articles created by Polbot